Birkrem is a Norwegian surname. Notable people with the surname include:

Åse Birkrem, Norwegian handball player 
Unni Birkrem, Norwegian handball goalkeeper

Norwegian-language surnames